The 40th British Academy Film Awards, given by the British Academy of Film and Television Arts in 1987, honoured the best films of 1986.

James Ivory's A Room with a View won the awards for Best Film, Actress, Supporting Actress, Production Design and Costume Design. Hannah and Her Sisters, directed by Woody Allen, won two awards: Best Director and Best Screenplay-Original.

Winners and nominees

Fellowship Award
Federico Fellini

Outstanding British Contribution to Cinema Award
Film Production Executives

Statistics

See also
 59th Academy Awards
 12th César Awards
 39th Directors Guild of America Awards
 44th Golden Globe Awards
 7th Golden Raspberry Awards
 1st Goya Awards
 2nd Independent Spirit Awards
 13th Saturn Awards
 39th Writers Guild of America Awards

Film040
1986 film awards
1987 in British cinema
March 1987 events in the United Kingdom
1986 awards in the United Kingdom